Sanyantang Town is an urban town in Yuanjiang, Yiyang, Hunan Province, People's Republic of China.

Administrative division
The town is divided into 17 villages and one community, the following areas: Haishang Community, Shiliping Village, Huangmaoxin Village, Sanyantang Village, Huangjiahu Village, Dongxing Village, Yongjian Village, Hehua Village, Haojianghu Village, Yangmeishan Village, Lianzitang Village, Jionglongshan Village, Chitang Village, Xianfeng Village, Longjia Village, Jiaoshanzui Village, Nanzhushan Village, and Yanzhihu Village (海上社区、十里坪村、黄茅新村、三眼塘村、黄家湖村、洞兴村、永建村、荷花村、浩江湖村、杨梅山村、莲子塘村、廻龙山村、赤塘村、先锋村、龙浃村、焦山嘴村、南竹山村、胭脂湖村).

References

External links

Divisions of Yuanjiang